The Quinlan Mountains is a mountain range in the U.S. state of Arizona.

The Quinlan Mountains are north of the Baboquivari Mountains, the two ranges separated by the pass at the head of the Pavo Kug Wash. The Quinlan range also sits southwest of the Coyote Mountains, separated from them by the Pan Tak Pass. When George J. Roskruge created the official map of Pima County in 1893, he named the range after James Quinlin, who had opened a stagecoach station in the nearby town of Quinlin in 1884. Although the range had also been known as the Quinlin or Quinuin mountains at different points in history, Quinlan became the official name as a result of a decision by the Board on Geographic Names on April 16, 1941.

References

Mountain ranges of Pima County, Arizona
Mountain ranges of the Sonoran Desert
Sonoran Desert